The Wenaha–Tucannon Wilderness is a federally designated wilderness area in the Blue Mountains of northeastern Oregon, and southeastern Washington, United States.

Topography
The Wehana–Tucannon Wilderness consists primarily of rugged basaltic ridges separated by deep canyons with steep slopes. The area's precipitation drains south into the Wenaha River, east to the Grande Ronde River and Asotin Creek, and north into the Tucannon River, each part of the Snake River watershed. To the west drainages are the Touchet River and Mill Creek, both leading to the Walla Walla River, and the Umatilla River, a direct tributary of the Columbia River.

Vegetation
Ponderosa pine dominates the lower drainages of the Wenaha–Tucannon Wilderness. Subalpine fir, native grasses, and forbs are found at the highest elevations of the wilderness.

Wildlife
The Wenaha–Tucannon Wilderness is home to a variety of wildlife, including Shiras moose, Rocky Mountain elk, bighorn sheep, whitetail and mule deer, black bear, cougar, grey wolf, coyote, snowshoe hare, rattlesnake, and pine marten.  Both the Tucannon and Wenaha Rivers provide spawning habitat for Chinook salmon and steelhead trout.

Recreation
Popular recreational activities in the Wenaha–Tucannon Wilderness include camping, horseback riding, wildlife watching, and hiking the area's  of trails.  Elk hunting and fishing are also popular pastimes in the wilderness.

Images

See also 
 List of Oregon Wildernesses
 List of U.S. Wilderness Areas
 National Wilderness Preservation System
 Wilderness Act

References

External links 
Wineha–Tucannon Wilderness - Umatilla National Forest

Protected areas of Asotin County, Washington
Protected areas of Columbia County, Washington
Protected areas of Garfield County, Washington
IUCN Category Ib
Protected areas of Wallowa County, Oregon
Wilderness areas of Oregon
Wilderness areas of Washington (state)
Umatilla National Forest
1984 establishments in Oregon